Afraflacilla arabica is a jumping spider species in the genus Afraflacilla that lives in Afghanistan. Egypt, Iran, and Yemen.

The species was originally discovered by Wanda Wesołowska and Tony van Harten in Yemen and described in 1994 and named Afraflacilla arabica. It was merged with Pseudicius braunsi. Discovered by Wesołowska in 1996, and moved to the genus Pseudicius with the species name arabicus by Dmitri Logunov and Mehrdad Zamanpoore in 2005. In 2017 it was moved back to Afraflacilla.

References 

Salticidae
Fauna of Afghanistan
Fauna of Egypt
Fauna of Iran
Spiders described in 1994
Spiders of Africa
Spiders of the Arabian Peninsula
Taxa named by Wanda Wesołowska